Lapland, also known by its Swedish name Lappland, is a province in northernmost Sweden. It borders Jämtland, Ångermanland, Västerbotten, Norrbotten, Norway and Finland. Nearly a quarter of Sweden's land area is in Lappland.

Lapland originally extended eastward. However, in 1809 the Russian Empire annexed the eastern part of Sweden, and created the Grand Duchy of Finland, which in effect split Lapland into a Swedish part and a Finnish part, both of which still exist today. It primarily consists of Västerbotten County in the south and Norrbotten County in the north, forming the further inland areas of the two counties. Lapland has the coldest climates of Sweden with vast seasonal differences caused by the high latitudes and the interior location.

History

The history of Lapland is in many ways connected to the history of Norrbotten County and Västerbotten County, since Lapland is a historic region connected to these counties. During the Middle Ages, Norrbotten/Lapland was considered a no man's land. The area was in fact populated by nomadic Sami people, but the region became increasingly settled by Swedish, Finnish and Norwegian settlers - especially along the coasts and large rivers. From the Middle Ages on, the Swedish kings tried to colonise and Christianise the area using settlers from what is now Finland and southern Sweden. Today, despite large-scale assimilation into the dominant Swedish culture, Finnish and Sami minorities continue to maintain their cultures and identities.

Despite independent cultural presence, religious beliefs were subject to conversion in the 17th and 18th centuries resulting in Laplanders generally leaving their original shamanism and converting to Lutheranism. Since the 19th century, Lapland has been particularly characterised by Laestadian Lutheranism.

During the industrialization of Sweden in the late-19th century, natural resources (hydroelectricity, timber and minerals) from Lapland and surrounding provinces played a key role. Still, mining, forestry and hydroelectric power are the backbone of the local economy, together with municipal services. The unemployment has however been relatively high for several decades and many young people leave for the larger cities by the coast or in southern Sweden.

Geography
Located in Sweden, Lapland is known for containing the Vindelfjällen Nature Reserve, one of the largest nature reserves in Sweden. Other parts of Lapland have been named a UNESCO World Heritage Site, the Laponian area, and the province contains some of the oldest and most spectacular national parks of northern Europe, e.g. Sarek National Park, established in 1909. Lapland has an area of 109,702 square km (c. 42,300 sq miles), larger than Austria and almost equal to Portugal. Its land area is also larger than the Benelux countries combined, being more than double the size of Switzerland and quite a bit larger than the island of Ireland.

National parks
Abisko
Björnlandet
Muddus
Padjelanta
Sarek
Stora Sjöfallet
Vadvetjåkka

Administration
The traditional provinces of Sweden serve no administrative or political purposes but are cultural and historical entities. Administratively, Lappland constitutes the western part of two counties of Sweden, Norrbotten County in the north and Västerbotten County in the south. In contrast to most other areas of Sweden, there is more of an identification with the counties rather than to provinces. Thus, most people in these counties refer to the entire county, including the areas in Lapland, when they say 'Norrbotten' or 'Västerbotten'.

Citizens of Sami descent are eligible to stand and vote in elections for the Swedish Sami Parliament, which is the case with Sami people elsewhere in Sweden as well. The Sami language has an official minority status in Kiruna Municipality, Gällivare Municipality, Jokkmokk Municipality and Arjeplog Municipality.

The following municipalities have their seats in Lapland:

 Arjeplog
 Arvidsjaur
 Dorotea
 Gällivare
 Jokkmokk
 Kiruna
 Lycksele
 Malå
 Sorsele
 Storuman
 Vilhelmina
 Åsele

Population
As of 31 December 2017, the population of Swedish Lapland is 91,333. Together with the rest of historical Lapland, the sum of the population is approximately 250,000. The largest cities are Kiruna with 23,178 inhabitants, Gällivare with 18,123 inhabitants and Lycksele with 12,177 inhabitants.

In Norrbotten County:
Kiruna (23,178)
Gällivare (18,123)
Jokkmokk (5,072)
Arjeplog (2,887)
Arvidsjaur (6,471)

In Västerbotten County:
Lycksele (12,177)
Vilhelmina (6,829)
Storuman (5,943)
Malå (3,109)
Åsele (2,814)
Dorotea (2,740)
Sorsele (2,516)

Heraldry
Lapland itself was never considered a duchy but on 18 January 1884 the Privy Council gave all Provinces the right of use to a ducal coronet for their arms. Blazon Swedish version: "Argent, a Wildman statant Gules wrapped with birch leaves Vert on the head and around the waist holding a Club Or in dexter over the shoulder." The wildman used to be depicted with more features, impressively drawn muscles and a dour expression on his face.

The wildman wielding a club as heraldic symbol of Lapland first appeared at the coronation of Charles IX of Sweden in 1607, then at the same king's burial in 1611. The colour red of his skin was decided only in 1949; before then various colours had been used (natural skin colour in the first half of the 20th century). The wildman, though unusual in heraldry, is an old symbol of the uncivilised north and appeared in books and woodcuts of the 16th century.

Climate
The southern parts of the province are significantly milder than the northern, due to the vast geographical differences. However, since Lapland is all made up of inland areas, maritime moderation is less significant than in the counties' coastal areas and in neighbouring Norway, resulting in harsh winters. Southern areas at a lower elevation such as Lycksele also have relatively warm summers. Due to the arctic circle, the northern areas of the province experience midnight sun and a moderate polar night with some civil twilight during opposite sides of the year.

Culture 

The culture of the Sami people, the national minority group Tornedalians and the conservative Lutheran Laestadian movement is prominent in the region.

Sports
Football in the province is administered by Norrbottens Fotbollförbund and Västerbottens Fotbollförbund.

Marketing
An EU-subsidised government tourism marketing organisation aiming to promote tourism in Northern Sweden has taken the brand name "Swedish Lapland". This name also covers towns in the coastal area of Gulf of Bothnia as well as the border area to Finland though neither areas are a part of the geographical province Swedish Lapland, rather the Lapland area as a whole in northern Scandinavia.

See also
Laponia (the province prior to 1809, including the present-day Finnish part)
Lappmarken
National parks in Lapland
Finnish Lapland
Sápmi (the larger traditional territory of the Sámi, often called "Lapland" or "Lappland" in English)

References

External links
Swedish Lapland Swedish Lapland, Sweden's northernmost destination
Arvidsjaur.eu - Arvidsjaur, In heart of Swedish Lapland
viaterra.net - Photos from the North of Sweden (Abisko, Lapporten, Torneträsk)

 
Provinces of Sweden